Secaucus, New Jersey is a town in Hudson County, New Jersey, USA.

Secaucus may also refer to:
Secaucus Junction, a heavy train station owned and operated by New Jersey Transit
Secaucus (album), a 1996 album by New Jersey band The Wrens

See also
Return of the Secaucus 7, a film